Mirabulbus yadongensis is a species of mite in the family Pachylaelapidae.

References

Acari